Lake Tūtira is a body of water in north-eastern Hawke's Bay in New Zealand.

Much of the area was surveyed by Herbert Guthrie-Smith, who farmed 60,000 acres (240 km²) surrounding the lake. Guthrie-Smith, a naturalist, published the popular Tutira: the story of a New Zealand sheep station in 1921. Today, a camp is run at the site of his homestead.

A small settlement, Tutira, is located near the lake, on State Highway 2 30 kilometres north of Whirinaki.

Sedimentary cores from the lake were used to demonstrate that the landslides mobilising sediments for transport into the lake occur in frequency and magnitude according to a power law.

Trout fishing is permitted as a stream flows into its northern reaches. For centuries Māori seasonally lived by Lake Tūtira and it is possible to see the remains of six pa sites. The Tutira Walkway, ascends to the Table Mountain trig station for views over Hawke's Bay and takes about five hours to complete.

Land Air Water Aotearoa describes the water quality as "poor", specifically showing eutrophic lake conditions. The lake suffers from periodic algal blooms.

Geological history 

The lake contains a high-resolution record of the sedimentation since its formation  about 6,500 years ago. It has a small catchment area, whose dominant erosion mechanism is landsliding; as a result of this, infrequent, large storms account for the bulk of the sedimentary depositional volume; Cyclone Bola is a particularly important recent example.

References

External links

Tutira Country Park at the Hawke's Bay Regional Council

Hastings District
Lakes of the Hawke's Bay Region